Stadium High School is a public high school in Tacoma, Washington, and a historic landmark. It is part of Tacoma Public Schools, or Tacoma School District No. 10 and is located in the Stadium District, near downtown Tacoma. The original building was severely damaged by a fire in 1898 while it was still a partially-constructed hotel designed by Hewitt & Hewitt being used for storage. It was reconstructed for use as a school beginning in 1906 according to designs by Frederick Heath, and a "bowl" stadium was added later in 1910.

Its attendance boundary includes Browns Point and Dash Point.

History

The main building was constructed by architects Hewitt and Hewitt for the Northern Pacific Railway and the Tacoma Land Company at what was then known as Blackwell Point. Construction began in 1891 with the intention of building a luxury hotel resembling a French château. The Panic of 1893, however, brought construction to an abrupt halt when the Northern Pacific was faced with financial disaster. The unfinished building became a storage facility, with much of the building materials still inside. On October 11, 1898, the building was gutted by a massive fire. The walls remained standing, and the Northern Pacific began to dismantle the structure, removing some 40,000 of the unique Roman bricks manufactured by Gladding, McBean that would be used to construct still-existing train stations in Missoula, Montana, and Wallace, Idaho.

The Tacoma School District purchased the gutted building on February 19, 1904, with the intent of turning it into a high school. The redesign and later renovations were planned by the school's architect, Frederick Heath. It was repaired and renovated into a school. Despite its extraordinary locale and design, on the inside it looks, feels, and operates like a typical American high school.

The reconstructed building opened on September 10, 1906, as Tacoma High School. Seven years later, the name was changed to reference the adjacent Stadium Bowl. Later additions included a circular lunchroom, an underground swimming pool, a science and industrial arts complex, a gymnasium, and a multi-story parking lot structure with tennis courts on the roof.

The stadium, also designed by Frederick Heath, dates from 1910 and is in a location once known as Old Woman's Gulch. It was originally much grander than it is today, with a seating capacity of 32,000. Among those who spoke there were Theodore Roosevelt, Woodrow Wilson, Warren G. Harding, William Jennings Bryan, and Billy Sunday.

Wooden molds were built to cast concrete for 31 rows of stadium seating surrounding the playfield.

The original structure exceeded what the soil could support. A restoration project in the 1970s had to sacrifice roughly half of the seating capacity because of instability. In 1981 a burst storm drain washed away the scoreboard and the bayward end zone of the football field. This was followed by a further restoration allowing the stadium to reopen in 1985.

The school was the filming location for many of the scenes of the 1999 movie 10 Things I Hate About You.

In 2005-2006 the school underwent a major renovation, seismic upgrade, historical restoration, and expansion. Bassetti Architects were the design architects, and Merrit Pardini Architects (later Krei Architecture) were the architects of record for this work.

The centennial celebration of Stadium High School was held on September 16, 2006. The celebration was attended by 3299 alumni, setting a Guinness World Record for the largest recorded school reunion.

Notable alumni

Bill Baarsma, 1960, Tacoma mayor
Sam Baker, former NFL Pro Bowl player; transferred after his junior year
Bruce Bennett (b. Herman Brix) 1924, Olympic shot-put medalist and Hollywood actor
Rosemarie Bowe, 1950, actress, wife of Robert Stack
 Angela Warnick Buchdahl (born 1972), rabbi
Cathryn Damon, 1947, stage, TV and film actress
R. N. DeArmond, author, historian
Jeff Durgan, professional soccer player (retired)
John Evans, 1975.  San Francisco Radio Broadcaster since 1979.  Elected in 2019 to the Bay Area Radio Hall Of Fame.
Evan Hunziker, man who spent three months in North Korean custody for illegally entering the country
Josh Keyes, artist
Edward LaChapelle, avalanche researcher
Al Libke, former MLB player (Cincinnati Reds)
Vicci Martinez, acoustic-rock singer/songwriter
Marjie Millar (b. Marjie Miller), 1949, TV and movie actress
Gordon Naccarato, 1972, restaurateur
Eric T. Olson, 1969, admiral and commander of U.S. Special Operations Command 
Janis Paige (b. Donna Mae Jaden), 1940, film and theater actress
Dixy Lee Ray, 1933, chair of federal Atomic Energy Commission, Governor of Washington
Debbie Regala, 1963, State Senator, District 27 - D
Irv Robbins, 1935?, co-founder  of Baskin-Robbins
Albert Rosellini, 1927, attorney, civic leader, governor of Washington
James Sargent Russell, 1918, admiral, commander of NATO forces in Europe
Sugar Ray Seales, 1971, boxer, 1972 Olympic gold medalist and professional prizefighter
Doug Sisk, former MLB player (New York Mets, Baltimore Orioles, Atlanta Braves)
Jeff Stock, professional soccer player
Jack Tuell, 1940, author and bishop in the United Methodist Church
Robert McCawley Short, 1925, aviator

References

External links 

 Stadium High School official site

North Tacoma, Washington
High schools in Pierce County, Washington
Schools in Tacoma, Washington
Frederick Heath buildings
Public high schools in Washington (state)
Educational institutions established in 1906
1906 establishments in Washington (state)